Acalolepta permutans is a species of beetle in the family Cerambycidae. It was described by Francis Polkinghorne Pascoe in 1857, originally under the genus Monohammus. It is known from Japan, Vietnam, Taiwan, and China. It feeds on Albizia julibrissin.

Subspecies
 Acalolepta permutans occidentalis (Breuning, 1958)
 Acalolepta permutans okinawana (Gressitt, 1951)
 Acalolepta permutans paucipunctata (Gressitt, 1938)
 Acalolepta permutans permutans (Pascoe, 1857)

References

Acalolepta
Beetles described in 1857
Taxa named by Francis Polkinghorne Pascoe